Las Piñas's at-large congressional district is the sole congressional district of the Philippines in the city of Las Piñas. It has been represented in the House of Representatives of the Philippines since 1998. Las Piñas first elected a single representative city-wide at-large for the 11th Congress following its conversion into a highly urbanized city through Republic Act No. 8251 on February 12, 1997. Before 1997, its territory was represented as part of Las Piñas–Muntinlupa, Las Piñas–Parañaque and Rizal's 1st and at-large district, and Manila's at-large district. It is currently represented in the 19th Congress by Camille Villar of the Nacionalista Party (NP).

Representation history

Election results

2022

2019

2016

2013

2010

See also
Legislative districts of Las Piñas

References

Congressional districts of the Philippines
Politics of Las Piñas
1997 establishments in the Philippines
At-large congressional districts of the Philippines
Congressional districts of Metro Manila
Constituencies established in 1997